Yana Marinova (Bulgarian: Яна Маринова) is a Bulgarian actress.

Life and career 
Yana was born on 17 August 1978 and completed higher education in economics. She married at 22 years old and has a son. She participates in Bulgarian feature films and serials, as well as foreign productions. She has presented various TV shows, and performs as a stuntwoman in some movies.

She is one of the advertising faces of Garnier Cosmetics.

Television 
In 2015, Yana Marinova played Elena Atanasova in the BTV series Glass Home.

Since 2015, she has hosted "The Voice Bulgaria"

From 2016, Marinova has played in BTV movie XIa.

Filmography

External links

References 

1978 births
Living people
Bulgarian television actresses
Actresses from Sofia
Bulgarian film actresses
Bulgarian stage actresses
21st-century Bulgarian actresses